This page details Honduran football league records.

All-time table
 From 1965–66 to 2018–19 Clausura
 Only regular season computed
 2 points per win
 Highlighted in green currently active (2022-23 season)

Winning percentage
 As of 2018–19
 Method of calculation: 1 point per win, 0.5 points per draw; divided by games played

Records
 Most League titles: 32
 Olimpia: 1966–67, 1967–68, 1969–70, 1971–72, 1977–78, 1982–83, 1984–85, 1986–87, 1987–88, 1989–90, 1992–93, 1995–96, 1996–97, 1998–99, 2000–01 A, 2002–03 A, 2003–04 C, 2004–05 C, 2005–06 A, 2005–06 C, 2007–08 C, 2008–09 C, 2009–10 C, 2011–12 A, 2011–12 C, 2012–13 A, 2012–13 C, 2013–14 C, 2014–15 C, 2015–16 C, 2019–20 A, 2020–21 A
 Most consecutive league titles: 4
 Olimpia: 2011–12 A, 2011–12 C, 2012–13 A, 2012–13 C
 Largest attendance: 38,256
 17 December 2006, Olimpia 1–3 Motagua at San Pedro Sula
 Most appearances: 55
 Marathón, Motagua, Olimpia, Real España and Vida
 Fewest defeats in season: 0
 Olimpia: 1969–70
 Goals scored so far: 21,003
 As of 2019–20 C

Players

Top scorers
 Updated 17 January 2021

By team
 Updated 17 January 2021

Most appearances
 Updated 17 January 2021

Most goals in one season
 As of 2019–20 Apertura

Most goals in one game
 As of 2019–20 Apertura

Most Hat-tricks

Most top scorer titles

 As of 2018–19

Most appearances in a team
  Mauricio Sabillón  Marathon 486

Most consecutive matches scoring
  Rubén Rodríguez Platense 8 (28 Jul to 15 September 1974)

Fastest 50 goals
  Luciano Emilio Real C.D. España , Olimpia 70 (games)

Youngest goalscorer 50 goals
  Roger Rojas Club Deportivo Olimpia 22 years 299 days vs Platense F.C.

Fastest goalscorer 100 goals
   Rubilio Castillo | Deportes Savio , C.D.S. Vida , F.C. Motagua 188 games

Youngest goalscorer 100 goals
  Rubilio Castillo '26 years 259 days vs Real C.D. España

Head to Head

List of Liga Nacional clubs head-to-head comparison (incomplete).

Qualifications by team
 Updated 10 January 2021Titles
DL = Domestic leaguesDC = Domestic cupsSC = Domestic SupercupsCA = Central American championships (includes Copa Fraternidad, Torneo Grandes de Centroamérica and/or UNCAF Interclub Cup)CC = CONCACAF championships (includes CONCACAF Champions League, CONCACAF Cup Winners Cup, CONCACAF Giants Cup and/or CONCACAF League).

Regular season performance
 From 1965–66 to 2020–21 Clausura

Top 10 attendances

Most active coaches
 Updated 17 January 2021''

References

External links
 RSSSF.com – Honduras – List of Champions
 RSSSF.com – Honduras – Final Tables 1965/66-1994/95
 Futhn – Campeones y Subcampeones de la Liga Nacional Desde 1965-66

Stats
Honduras
Association football league records and statistics